Willow is an American high fantasy adventure television series based on and serving as a sequel to the 1988 film of the same name. Produced by Lucasfilm and Imagine Entertainment, the series was mostly filmed in Wales in April 2021, and premiered on the streaming service Disney+ on November 30, 2022. In March 2023, the series was canceled after only  one season, though Jonathan Kasdan stated that the series was on hiatus.

Premise
It has been more than 20 years since Queen Bavmorda was defeated. An unlikely group of six heroes sets off on a dangerous quest to places far beyond their home where they must face their inner demons and come together to save their world from the Gales.

Cast and characters

Main
 Warwick Davis as Willow Ufgood, a Nelwyn sorcerer who leads a party to rescue the twin brother of Princess Kit Tanthalos.
 Ellie Bamber as Elora Danan, future Empress of Tir Asleen, disguised as a kitchen maid named "Dove", who is in love with Airk and joins the quest to save him from the Gales. She was previously portrayed by Kate Greenfield, Ruth Greenfield, Rebecca Bearman, Kristen Lang, Isla Brentwood, Laura Hopkirk, and Gina Nelson as an infant in the film. Alayna Jacobs portrays a 5-year-old Elora. Bamber also portrays the Wyrm in "Children Of The Wyrm".
 Ruby Cruz as Princess Kit Tanthalos, the princess of Tir Asleen, who sets in motion a quest to rescue her twin brother Airk.
 Erin Kellyman as Jade, a knight-in-training. She is the long-lost daughter of General Kael, and Kit's love interest, who joins in the quest to save Prince Airk. The relationship between Kit and Jade makes the series "the first true franchise on Disney Plus to really center a queer story", according to Polygon.
 Tony Revolori as Prince Graydon, the Prince of Galladoorn and member of the quest. Benjamin Revolori, Tony Revolori's younger brother, portrays a younger Prince Graydon.
 Amar Chadha-Patel as Thraxus Boorman, an imprisoned, self-proclaimed treasure hunter and swordsman who claims to have a history with Madmartigan. He is offered freedom from the dungeon by Queen Sorsha if he joins her daughter's quest.
 Dempsey Bryk as Prince Airk, Kit's twin brother, who is kidnapped by the Gales

Guest
 Joanne Whalley as Queen Sorsha, an accomplished warrior, ruler of Tir Asleen, wife of Madmartigan, and daughter of the defeated Bavmorda. Sorsha has since become mother of twins Kit and Airk and the guardian of Elora.
 Ralph Ineson as Commander Ballantine, Jade's adoptive father and loyal servant of Queen Sorsha
 Sifiso Mazibuko as Merrick, a soldier working under Commander Ballantine.
 Kenny Knight as Lieutenant Keene, a soldier working under Commander Ballantine.
 Derek Horsham as King Hastur, the King of Galladoorn and Graydon's father.
 Talisa Garcia as Queen Arianna, the Queen of Galladoorn and Graydon's mother.
 Eileen Davies as Prunella, a senior servant of Queen Sorsha who "Dove" answers to.
 Simon Armstrong as Jørgen Kase, a warrior and trainer of Airk.  
 Joonas Suotamo as the Scourge, a hulking monstrosity who wears a cage over his head and a member of the Gales
 Daniel Naprous as the Doom, a hooded, robed, and masked member of the Gales
 Vitas Le Bas as the Lich, a member of the Gales who infects Commander Ballantine
 Claudia Hughes as the Dag, a shape-shifting member of the Gales
 Simeon Dyer as Karthy, a Nelwyn who is Willow's apprentice.
 Graham Hughes as Silas, a gruff Nelwyn warrior and friend of Willow. 
 Annabelle Davis as Mims, Willow's daughter. She was previously portrayed by Dawn Downing in the film.
 Sarah Bennett as Libby, Silas' wife.
 Hannah Waddingham and Caoimhe Farren as Hubert and Anne, two forest women awaiting the arrival of Elora Danan. Executive producer and writer, Wendy Mericle, has said that the intent, at least for her, was for Hubert and Anne to be a married lesbian couple.
 Jane Carr as the voice of the Crone, the leader of the Gales. Chus Lucas and Annabel Canavan serve as the stunt doubles of the Crone.
 Rosabell Laurenti Sellers portrays the Crone's form of Lili, a mysterious woman whom Airk meets in the Immemorial City Like the Crone, Lucas and Canavan serve as the stunt doubles of the Crone.
 Jean Marsh as Queen Bavmorda, the deceased mother of Queen Sorsha and the grandmother of Kit and Airk, who was defeated by Willow. Archive footage of Marsh from the film was used for flashbacks in this show where Marsh also recorded additional dialogue for "The Whispers of Nockmaar".
 Mario Revolori as Dermot, the older brother of Graydon and the son of King Hastur and Queen Ariana who died falling from a tree when Graydon was infected by an unknown illness. 
 Sallyanne Law as Mother, the deceased mother of Elora Danan, who was killed on Bavmorda’s orders. Archive footage was used for flashbacks in this show where Law also recorded additional dialogue for "The Whispers of Nockmaar". 
 Mark Slaughter and Sam Witwer as General Kael, Queen Bavmorda's chief lieutenant and right-hand man, who would later be revealed to be the first Bone Reaver and the father of Jade and Scorpia. Slaughter provides the physical stunt performance for General Kael mixed with archive footage while Witwer provides the uncredited voice of General Kael. He was previously portrayed by Pat Roach in the film.
 Kevin Pollak as Rool, a brownie and former travel companion of Willow and Madmartigan. While Rool remained in his home, Franjean was mentioned to have headed south.
 Amelia Vitale as Ganush, a Brownie who is the daughter of Rool through Franjean's ex-wife.
 Adwoa Aboah as Scorpia, the leader of the Bone Reavers, General Kael's daughter, Boorman's former lover, and Jade's long-lost older sister
 Charlie Rawes as Lori Toth, a Bone Reaver who is insecure about his first name.
 Christian Slater as Allagash, a prisoner in Skellin who was a companion of Madmartigan and Boorman.
 Tom Wilton as Sarris, a polite-speaking troll and chief administrator of the Dread Mines of Skellin whose tribe is in league with the Crone.
 Dee Tails as Falken, a gruff-speaking troll and Sarris' brother.
 Danny Woodburn as the voice of Wiggleheim, a late Nelwyn sorcerer whose voice was heard in his tomb giving riddles to access his treasure.
 Julian Glover as Zeb, an old fisherman and former paladin of Cashmere who lives by the Shattered Sea.

Val Kilmer appears as Madmartigan via archive footage from the Willow film. His son, Jack, provided Madmartigan's voice in "Prisoners of Skellin" and "Children of the Wyrm".

Episodes

Production

Development
Discussions about a continuation of the film began as early as 2005, with Warwick Davis reiterating his interest in returning in multiple interviews. During a May 2019 interview with an MTV podcast, Ron Howard, director of the 1988 film, revealed he had been approached by Jonathan Kasdan about rebooting the film as a television series at Disney+.

In October 2020, the series was greenlit, with Jon M. Chu directing the pilot episode and Davis reprising his titular role.  Chu would announce that he had to step away from directing duties due to a production delay and personal reasons in January 2021. Later that month, Jonathan Entwistle was hired to replace Chu as director of the pilot, and as executive producer. However, due to production delays as a result of a recasting, Entwistle also exited the series, with Stephen Woolfenden coming in to direct the first two episodes of the series. In March 2023, Disney+ canceled the series after only one season. However, Kasdan took to Twitter declaring that the cast was released from their contracts due to the shifts going on at Disney and that there is hope that the series could still pick up at some point in the future.

Casting
In November 2020, Erin Kellyman, Cailee Spaeny and Ellie Bamber entered negotiations to join the cast. In January 2021, Tony Revolori would enter negotiations to join the cast, which was now confirmed to include Kellyman, Spaeny and Bamber. Revolori would be confirmed to join the cast in March, along with the recasting of Spaeny with Ruby Cruz. Amar Chadha-Patel would join the next month. By November 2021, Ralph Ineson was added to the cast. In April 2022, Talisa García and Rosabell Laurenti Sellers were cast, with Garcia starring as Revolori's character's mother, marking the first time a transgender actor has appeared in a Lucasfilm production. In May 2022, Joanne Whalley appeared at the Lucasfilm panel at Star Wars Celebration, revealing that she would be reprising her role as Sorsha from the original film. At the D23 Expo in September, Kevin Pollak was revealed to be reprising his role from the film, with Christian Slater also being announced as part of the cast.

Val Kilmer was unable to participate in filming to reprise his role as Madmartigan due to his recovery from throat cancer and the ongoing COVID-19 pandemic, but Davis and Kasdan stated in May 2022 that his character would still be involved "in a big way". Although he had lost full use of his vocal cords because of his throat cancer, Kilmer still initially recorded Madmartigan's lines. This was then used as a guide track for his son Jack, who duplicated his father's voice in the same way that he did in their 2021 documentary film Val.

Filming
Production for the series began in June 2021 in Wales, with Dragon Studios near Llanharan being used as a location. During production, five stages totalling 28,000 square feet were constructed at Dragon Studios. The set for Tir Asleen Castle was built on a six acre lot at Dragon Studios. In addition, a set for the "Immemorial City" was constructed at Dragon Studios, which drew inspiration from Blade Runner 2049. Lucasfilm also built 20 additional buildings around Dragon Studios for the purposes of creature creation, puppeteering work, special effects constructions, and costumes. To comply with local COVID-19 pandemic health and safety guidelines, these buildings were built with substantial space and ventilation.

In addition to Dragon Studios, filming took place at 32 locations across Wales including Pendine Sands, Morlais Quarry, Merthyr Mawr, Neath Abbey, Snowdonia, and Holyhead. For the production, Lucasfilm received funding from Creative Wales to hire 25 trainees for six months. Lucasfilm also hired 335 full-time crew members including 206 Welsh citizens. Due to a determined effort to hire local crew in senior roles, 17 of the 29 production departments were led by Welsh citizens. Non-Welsh crew were also paired with Welsh citizens. Significant post-production work also took places in Wales.

Music
The score for the series is composed by James Newton Howard and Xander Rodzinski and includes the themes from the film composed by James Horner.

Marketing
A trailer of Willow was released at Star Wars Celebration on May 26, 2022. A second trailer and official poster were released at the Disney fan expo D23 on September 10, 2022. The D23 expo also featured a panel consisting of several Willow cast members including Davis and Slater. On November 1 during the Lucca Comics & Games 2022, a part of the first episode and exclusive video clips of the series was shown in world premiere in the presence of actors Ellie Bamber, Erin Kellyman and Amar Chadha-Patel.

Reception

Audience viewership 
According to the streaming aggregator JustWatch, Willow was the 3rd most streamed television series across all platforms in the United States, during the week of December 5, 2022, to December 11, 2022. According Whip Media's TV Time, Willow was the 6th most streamed television series across all platforms in the United States, during the week of December 11, 2022, the 6th during the week of December 18, 2022, the 6th during the week of December 25, 2022, the 5th during the week of January 1, 2023, the 5th during the week of January 8, 2023, and the 6th during the week of January 15, 2023. According to the streaming aggregator Reelgood, Willow was the 6th most streamed program across all platforms in the United States, during the week of December 14, 2022.

Critical response 

The review aggregator website Rotten Tomatoes reported an 86% approval rating with an average rating of 7/10, based on 62 critic reviews. The website's critics consensus reads, "Expanding on the saga while leaving plenty of room for callbacks to the original, this series-length sequel should satisfy fans who've been patiently waiting for more Willow." Metacritic, which uses a weighted average, assigned a score of 70 out of 100 based on 22 critics, indicating "generally favorable reviews."

Accolades 
Willow received a nomination for Outstanding New TV Series at the 34th GLAAD Media Awards.

References

External links
 
 

2020s American LGBT-related drama television series
2020s American drama television series
2022 American television series debuts
2023 American television series endings
American adventure television series
American fantasy television series
American sequel television series
Disney+ original programming
English-language television shows
Lesbian-related television shows
Live action television shows based on films
Television series by Imagine Entertainment
Television series by Lucasfilm
Television shows filmed at Pinewood Studios
Television shows filmed in Wales
Willow (film)
Witchcraft in television